Some Love Lost is a retail mixtape by American rapper Joe Budden. The mixtape was released on November 4, 2014, by Mood Muzik Entertainment and E1 Music.

Critical reception

Carl Lamarre of XXL said, "While Some Love Lost serves as merely an appetizer to his upcoming album All Love Lost, Joe Budden's anguish and candor on this project will do more than enough to hold over his ravenous fan base." Andre Grant of HipHopDX stated, "As a meal before the main course, Some Love Lost, is a lonely one. But Joe’s change in style (to the autobiographical slaughter it is now) is interesting, and he claims he's got his best work on deck. As for this one, it is an ambitious dumping of his tragedies on paper. But it also leaves Joe and this project rolling a rock up hill that never quite gets there."

Commercial performance
The album debuted at number 55 on the Billboard 200, with sales of 7,695 copies in the United States.

Track listing

References

2014 EPs
Joe Budden albums
E1 Music albums
Sequel albums